Devils Mountain or Devil's Mountain can refer to any of several peaks with similar names: 
Devil Mountain, Ontario, Canada
Devil's Tower (disambiguation)
Devil's Peak (disambiguation)
Ayan or Auyán-tepui (Devil's House), Venezuela
Morro do Diabo (Devil's Hill), Rio Grande do Sul, Brazil

See also
Devil Mountain Lakes, Alaska, United States
Kill Devil Hills, North Carolina, United States
Seven Devils Mountains, Idaho, United States
Teufelsberg (disambiguation), the German name for "Devil's Mountain"